List of defunct newspapers includes:
List of defunct newspapers of Australia
List of defunct newspapers of Canada
List of defunct newspapers of Quebec
List of defunct newspapers of France
List of defunct newspapers of Germany
List of defunct newspapers of Hungary
List of defunct newspapers of Norway
List of defunct newspapers of Russia
List of defunct newspapers of Turkey
List of defunct newspapers of the United States
List of defunct newspapers of Hartford City, Indiana
List of defunct Massachusetts newspapers
List of defunct newspapers of North Carolina

Defunct newspapers by country